Stig Blomberg (October 16, 1901 – December 19, 1970) was a Swedish sculptor. He was born in Linköping.

In 1936 he won a bronze medal in the art competitions of the summer Olympic Games for his "Brottande pojkar" ("Wrestling Youths"). In 1956 he was awarded the Prince Eugen Medal for sculpture.

See also
Art competitions at the 1936 Summer Olympics

References

External links
 profile

1901 births
1970 deaths
People from Linköping
Swedish male sculptors
Olympic bronze medalists in art competitions
20th-century Swedish sculptors
Recipients of the Prince Eugen Medal
Olympic competitors in art competitions
Medalists at the 1936 Summer Olympics